The Precision Sniper Rifle (PSR) was a program by United States Special Operations Command to replace all bolt-action sniper rifles in use by United States special operations snipers with a single bolt-action rifle chambered for a large caliber Magnum chambering like .300 Win Mag, and .338 Lapua Magnum. The solicitation was placed on January 15, 2009.  The contract was awarded to Remington Arms for their Modular Sniper Rifle as Mk 21 Precision Sniper Rifle

History
A 2008 United States military market survey for a Precision Sniper Rifle (PSR) called for 1 minute of arc (0.3 milliradian) extreme vertical spread for all shots in a 5-round group fired at targets at 300, 600, 900, 1,200 and 1,500 meters.

In 2009 a United States Special Operations Command market survey called for 1 MOA (0.3 mrad) extreme vertical spread for all shots in a 10-round group fired at targets at 300, 600, 900, 1,200 and 1,500 meters.
The 2009 Precision Sniper Rifle requirements stated that the PSR when fired without suppressor should provide a confidence factor of 80% that the weapon and ammunition combination is capable of holding 1 MOA extreme vertical spread, calculated from 150 ten (10) round groups  fired unsuppressed. No individual group to exceed 1.5 MOA (0.5 mrad) extreme vertical spread. All accuracy taken at the 1,500 meter point.
Other requirements were that the rifle weigh less than 18 pounds loaded, have Picatinny rails, and have an easily  changeable barrel.

Tender criteria
Sniper Rifle requirements included:
The system shall be chambered to safely fire factory produced "non-wildcat" Small Arms Ammunition Manufacturing Institute (SAAMI) or Commercial European standard (CIP) ammunition.
The action can be either manually or gas operated and available in left and right hand versions.
With primary day optic and ammunition the system shall provide 1.0 MOA from 300 to 1500 meters (in 300 meter increments) when fired from the shoulder or an accuracy fixture in nominal conditions.This is further defined as 1 MOA Extreme Vertical Spread for all shots in a 10 round group at the stated distances.
Mean Rounds Between Failures (MRBF) shall be 1000 rounds.
The system shall have an overall length no greater than 52" in full configuration / extended excluding suppressor with a single component no greater in length than 40".
The system shall weigh no more than 18 lbs with a 12:00 MilStd 1913 rail and a loaded magazine with 5 rounds.
The system shall be capable of operator breakdown into major components in less than two minutes.
The system will assemble from the major component breakdown in less than two minutes by the operator.
The system will assemble from breakdown with no change in weapon zero.
The system will have an integral MilStd 1913 rail at the 12:00 position, the rail will be capable of maintaining bore sight alignment and weapon zero while conducting routine firing combined with combat movement and operational training drills.

PSR contenders

Contenders for the contract included:
Accuracy International AX 338
ArmaLite AR-30
Barrett MRAD (Multi-Role Adaptive Design)
Blaser Tactical 2
Desert Tactical Arms SRS
FN Ballista 
PGM 338
Remington Modular Sniper Rifle
Sako TRG M10.

Selection
On March 8, 2013, Remington announced that the Modular Sniper Rifle had won the contract, beating out the Sako TRG M10.  The contract is worth US$79.7 million for 5,150 rifles including suppressors, and 4,696,800 rounds of ammunition over the following ten years.

Re-compete

However, in 2018 it was decided that the Mk 21 did not conform to SOCOM requirements at the time, and the program was re-competed with the Barrett MRAD selected in 2019 as the Mk 22 Advanced Sniper Rifle solution.

See also 
M2010 Enhanced Sniper Rifle
Mk 14 Enhanced Battle Rifle

References

External links
 Precision Sniper Rifle

Sniper rifles of the United States
.338 Lapua Magnum rifles